Sailen Ghosh (1931 – 14 August 2016.) was a Bengali child literator and a dramatist.

|

Career
Sailen Ghosh played a role in the drama Dakghar, written by Rabindranath Tagore, when he was in Class IX. The death of the protagonist Amal at the end of the story affected him so much that he wrote a new drama, Gharer Kheya, by adopting the same theme.

Ghosh wrote and directed dramas for children. In 1959, he became affiliated with the Manimela organisation and started writing for them. He won several awards, including the prestigious Sangeet Natak Akademi Award, Vidyasagar Award and Jawaharlal Nehru Fellowship. He wrote several short stories, novels and dramas for children in various Bengali magazines, including Anandamela and Sandesh.

He lived alone in his apartment at Kestopur, Kolkata.

Sishu Rangan
Ghosh was a founder member and actively involved with the Sishu Rangan organisation, a voluntary body that teaches children the basics of acting, dancing and singing. It was established in 1970. He was the General Secretary of Sishu Rangan, from its foundation day to till 6 March 2016.

Accolades
 Sangeet Natya Academy Award for his drama Arun Barun Kironmala in 1963.
 National award for his novel Mitul Naame Putulti (written in 1968).
 Nehru Fellowship award from "Jahar Shishu Bhavan" for his contribution in Child literature and Children Organisation
 Mouchak & Moumachi award.

Works

Arun Barun Kironmala
Aay Brishti Rimjhim
Alor Akashe Eagle
Ajob Bagher Ajgubi
Amar Naam Tayra
Abu o Dasyu-Sardar
Ajob Bherar Golpo
Bon-Sabujer Dweepe
Bajna
Bagdoom Sing
Bhalobasa'r chotto Harin
Bhuter Naam Akkush
Chotto Sonar Golpo Sona
Dusahosi Dui Buro
Golpo Jure Ala
Golper Minare Pakhi
Golpo Sangroho
Golper Bhelki
Huppoke Niye Gopppo
Itimichi Saheb
Jadur Deshe Jagannath
Khude Nayoker Naamti Rung
Kala Juju
Khude Jajabor Istashi
Kalo Ghora'r Sowar
Kolpoloker Golpo E Noy
Mitul Naame Putulti
Ma,Ek Nirbhik Sainki
Masto Golper Chotto Roshon
Nach Re Ghora Nach
Natun Diner Nayok
Sona-Jhora Golper Inka
Swapner Jadukori
Sonalir Din
Tora Aar Badsha

References

 4.^https://zeenews.india.com/bengali/kolkata/writer-sailen-ghosh-no-more_146670.html retrieved on 29 January,2022

External links
Sailen Ghosh in his speaks

Bengali writers
2016 deaths
1931 births
Bengali-language writers
Writers from Kolkata
Jawaharlal Nehru Fellows
Indian children's writers
20th-century Indian dramatists and playwrights
Dramatists and playwrights from West Bengal